Mount Hooker is a rounded summit over  high, standing immediately south of Mount Lister in the Royal Society Range of Victoria Land, Antarctica. It was discovered by the British National Antarctic Expedition, 1901–04, which named it for Sir Joseph Dalton Hooker.

References

Royal Society Range
Mountains of Victoria Land
Scott Coast